From Genesis to Revelation is the debut studio album by English rock band Genesis, released in March 1969 on Decca Records. The album originated from a collection of demos recorded in 1967 while the members of Genesis were pupils of Charterhouse in Godalming, Surrey. It caught the attention of Jonathan King who named the group, organised deals with his publishing company and Decca, and studio time at Regent Sound Studios to record a series of singles and a full album. A string section arranged and conducted by Arthur Greenslade was added later on some songs. By the time Genesis had finished recording, John Silver had replaced original drummer Chris Stewart.

The album and its singles were a commercial flop, and received a mixed to negative reaction from critics. By mid-1969, the group had severed ties with King and resumed education until they reformed and turned Genesis into a full-time band. The album spawned three singles; "The Silent Sun" and "A Winter's Tale" were released in 1968, followed by "Where the Sour Turns to Sweet" in 1969. In October 1974, after the group had grown in popularity, it peaked at No. 170 on the Billboard 200 in the US. King retains the rights to the album which has been reissued multiple times since, including a 1974 release as In the Beginning and a 1987 release as And the Word Was.... A reissue in 1990 and 2005 included a bonus disc with extra tracks.

Background
The founding line-up of Genesis consisted of guitarist Anthony Phillips, bassist Mike Rutherford, lead vocalist Peter Gabriel, keyboardist Tony Banks, and drummer Chris Stewart, all pupils of Charterhouse School in Godalming, Surrey. The five had played in the school's two active bands; Rutherford and Phillips were in Anon while Gabriel, Banks, and Stewart made up Garden Wall. In January 1967, after both groups had split, Phillips and Rutherford continued to write songs and invited Gabriel and Banks to participate. During the Easter school holiday the five entered a primitive recording studio run by Brian Roberts in Chiswick to record the material. They assembled a tape of six songs originally intended for someone else to perform as the group saw themselves foremost as a collection of songwriters. This included five songs from Phillips and Rutherford: "Don't Want You Back", "Try a Little Sadness", "That's Me", "Listen on Five", and "Patricia", an instrumental, plus one from Gabriel and Banks, "She Is Beautiful". "Patricia" was later reworked into "In Hiding" and "She Is Beautiful" was later known as "The Serpent". Banks described the material as "straight pop music" as it was the direction the band wanted to explore. At this point, the group were known as The New Anon.

The group sent the demo tape to two people, one being BBC radio presenter David Jacobs. The second was sent to former Charterhouse pupil Jonathan King who had scored commercial success as a singer-songwriter and producer with his UK top five single "Everyone's Gone to the Moon" in 1965, and therefore seemed a natural choice. King visited the school during Old Boys Day, so the group had a friend give the tape to him. He listened to the tape in his car on his drive home and, despite its roughness, was immediately enthusiastic, particularly about Gabriel's vocals.

Recording

King offered his support to the band and paid them £40 to record four songs. He pressed for more simple arrangements, but maintained that his suggestion for the group to avoid playing electric instruments was because acoustic instruments were cheaper, rather than his personal taste. These early sessions took place between August and December 1967 at Regent Sound Studios on Denmark Street, London, with the intent on releasing them as singles. The four tracks put down were new arrangements of "She's Beautiful" and "Try a Little Sadness", with "Where the Sour Turns to Sweet" and "The Image Blown Out", the latter ultimately rejected from the album. King was happy with the results enough to sign them, offering a ten-year deal with his publishing company JonJo Music with a five-year option and 2% of the royalties, and a five-year recording deal with Decca Records with an optional second year. However, the group's parents expressed concern as they were aged between 15 and 17 at the time and preferred their children to pursue careers away from music. Upon their intervention, family solicitors took charge and arranged for a new, one-year deal with an optional second.

King noticed the band's tendency to expand and complicate their arrangements, which he disliked and suggested they stick to straightforward pop songs. This culminated in King either trimming Banks's solo spots or removing them entirely, much to his annoyance. In response, Gabriel and Banks wrote "The Silent Sun" as a pastiche of the Bee Gees, one of King's favourite bands, though King later claimed the Bee Gees pastiche description was inaccurate. The song was recorded at Regent Sound studio A in December 1967, with a section arranged and conducted by Arthur Greenslade added later in production. It was released on 22 February 1968 with "That's Me" on the B-side as the first Genesis single. King came up with the group's name, thinking it marked the beginning of a "new sound and a new feeling", and that it was the true start of his career as a producer. Other names included King's suggestion of Gabriel's Angels and Phillips's idea, Champagne Meadow. In May 1968, the second single of "A Winter's Tale" with "One-Eyed Hound", was released and, like their first, also flopped. Stewart then left the group to continue with his studies.

Despite their lack of success King continued to support the group and, by mid-1968, suggested that a studio album might reverse their fortunes. The group were a little overwhelmed in working with a greater amount of available time on an LP, so King suggested the idea of a loose concept album that told a story about the Book of Genesis at the start and the Book of Revelation at the end, with linked instrumental tracks. The idea worked, and the group began to write at a faster pace. The band recruited fellow Charterhouse pupil John Silver on the drums, and wrote and rehearsed their new material at his parents' country home in Oxford and the parents of school friend David Thomas.

In August 1968, during the school summer holidays, the band returned to Regent Sound studio 2 to record From Genesis to Revelation. The music was recorded within two days, and the album was put together in ten. King was the producer, and brought in Brian Roberts and former Charterhouse pupil Tom Allom as recording engineers. The sessions involved two four-track recording machines, and marked Banks's first time playing an organ. The material put down, Greenslade and Lou Warburton then added more string and horn arrangements to one stereo channel while mixing the band's performance on the other. This was done without the band's knowledge, which they thought compromised the strength of the songs. Phillips was particularly angered at the decision and was the only member to express his feelings towards it by stomping out of the studio on the last day.

Release and reception

The album was released in March 1969 and failed to chart. "Where the Sour Turns to Sweet" was released as a single on 27 June 1969 in an attempt to stimulate new interest. The album was released in the U.S. in 1974 after the group had grown in popularity, and peaked at No. 170 on the Billboard 200 in October of that year.

Prior to its release, Decca discovered that an American act had also called themselves Genesis and asked the band to change its name to avoid confusion. King reached a compromise so the band's name would be omitted from the sleeve, leaving the album's title written in gold text in a Gothic style in order to evoke mystery when presented in music shops. The American Genesis in question was likely a Los Angeles-based group that released In the Beginning on the Mercury label in 1967. Banks later said that they remained Genesis in the UK and put themselves down as Revelation in the US, giving additional meaning to the album's title. However, King's idea for the sleeve failed after shops had placed the album in their religious sections, "and it sank without trace". He later said that Decca was unable to promote the album effectively and get the exposure it needed to succeed, leaving him to carry out much of the work himself which he lacked enough experience in at the time.

The album sold 649 copies. Many record shops filed the album in their religious music sections, since the title From Genesis to Revelation was the only descriptive text on the album. Banks later deemed the material as merely poor renditions of their songs, rating "Silent Sun" and "In the Wilderness" as the strongest cuts.

Noel Gallagher is a fan of the album, saying, "I became obsessed with early Genesis" despite being a frequent critic of the group's later work, particularly the Phil Collins-led era. The track "If Love Is the Law" from his album Who Built the Moon? was written as a pastiche of "The Conqueror".

Aftermath
When the album failed to become a success, the group decided to split and resume education. This marked the end of their association with King, who had grown increasingly dissatisfied with the band directing their material away from mainstream pop. In addition, Genesis had fulfilled their contractual obligation with Decca with the release of "Where the Sour Turns to Sweet", and neither they nor King were interested in renewing the deal. In September 1969, Gabriel, Banks, Rutherford, and Phillips decided to make Genesis a full-time band and write on their own musical terms which had developed to what Phillips described as "original and dramatic".They replaced Silver with drummer John Mayhew, and toured England for six months. Their residency at Ronnie Scott's club in Soho, London caught the attention of Tony Stratton-Smith who signed them to his label, Charisma Records. Genesis began formulating the music that would be recorded on their next album, Trespass.

Material that was put onto tape during this time but remained unreleased was included on the Genesis Archive 1967–75 box set, in 1998. This included tracks on From Genesis to Revelation without the string arrangements. Some of the tapes had been in storage in Phillips's attic, and he initially pleaded with the group not to release them due to what he considered poor guitar work.

On 27 July 1990, the album was reissued in a two disc set. The second disc included the four tracks included on And the Word Was....., four early versions of songs on the album, and ten interviews. On 25 October 2010, the album was released as a special edition on iTunes. It includes the bonus tracks from the 1990 reissue.

Reissues
Although King initially had From Genesis to Revelation licensed to Decca Records on a short term basis, he continues to hold the rights to the album and has re-released it several times under a variety of titles. He chooses to reissue it when there is demand for it, and claimed that Genesis have not attempted to purchase the rights from him. Banks said the group did attempt to purchase the rights but King wanted "vast sums" for it. The album was not included in their Genesis 1970–1975 box set which covers the rest of the band's era with Gabriel.

Track listing
All songs written by Tony Banks, Peter Gabriel, Anthony Phillips, and Mike Rutherford.

Personnel
Credits are adapted from the original 1969 release.

Genesis
Peter Gabriel – lead vocals, flute
Tony Banks – Hammond organ, piano, backing vocals
Anthony Phillips – guitars, backing vocals
Mike Rutherford – bass guitar, guitar, backing vocals
John Silver – drums (except on "Silent Sun")

Additional musicians
Chris Stewart – drums on "Silent Sun"
Arthur Greenslade – strings and horn arrangement, conducting
Lou Warburton – strings and horn arrangement, conducting

Production
Jonathan King – producer
Brian Roberts – recording engineer
Tom Allom – recording engineer
Robert Stace – printing

References

Sources
 

 
 
 
 

1969 debut albums
Genesis (band) albums
Decca Records albums
London Records albums
Albums produced by Jonathan King
Albums conducted by Arthur Greenslade
Albums arranged by Arthur Greenslade
Concept albums